Alsophila schliebenii, synonym Cyathea fadenii, is a species of tree fern endemic to the Uluguru Mountains in Tanzania, where it grows on exposed ridges and on the upper edge of montane forest at an altitude of 1700–2100 m. The trunk is erect, up to 4 m tall and 3–5 cm in diameter. Fronds are bipinnate. Characteristically of this species, the most basal pair of pinnae are reduced, often to veins alone.

References

schliebenii
Endemic flora of Tanzania